Lethal Film is a 1988 Swedish drama film directed by Suzanne Osten. Lena T. Hansson won the award for Best Actress at the 24th Guldbagge Awards.

Cast
 Stina Ekblad as Menaden
 Agneta Ekmanner as Görel Key
 Björn Gedda as Labbtekniker
 Etienne Glaser as Emil
 Lena T. Hansson as Ingrid Stromboli
 Gunilla Röör as Ella
 Bo Samuelson as Ljudtekniker
 Lars Wiik as Skådespelare
 Rikard Wolff as Sminkör
 Philip Zandén as Philip Zandén

References

External links
 
 

1988 films
1988 drama films
Swedish drama films
1980s Swedish-language films
Films directed by Suzanne Osten
1980s Swedish films